Iron Fist (Daniel Thomas "Danny" Rand) is a fictional character appearing in American comic books published by Marvel Comics. Created by Roy Thomas and Gil Kane, Iron Fist first appeared in Marvel Premiere #15 (May 1974). The character is a practitioner of martial arts and the wielder of a mystical force known as the Iron Fist, which allows him to summon and focus his chi. This ability is obtained from the city of K'un-Lun, which appears on Earth every 10 years.

He starred in his own solo series in the 1970s, and shared the title Power Man and Iron Fist for several years with Luke Cage, partnering with Cage to form the superhero team Heroes for Hire. Rand frequently appeared with the Daughters of the Dragon duo Misty Knight and Colleen Wing – with Rand often seen in a relationship with the former, marking the first interracial romance in Marvel Comics history. The character has starred in numerous solo titles since, including The Immortal Iron Fist, which expanded on his origin story and the history of the Iron Fist.

Iron Fist has been adapted to appear in several animated television series and video games. Finn Jones portrayed the character in the live-action Marvel Cinematic Universe (MCU) Netflix television series Iron Fist (2017–2018), The Defenders (2017), and the second season of Luke Cage.

Development

Iron Fist, along with the previously created Shang-Chi, Master of Kung Fu, came from Marvel Comics during an American pop culture trend in the early to mid-1970s of martial arts heroes. Writer/co-creator Roy Thomas wrote in a text piece in Marvel Premiere #15 that Iron Fist's origin and creation owe much to the Bill Everett character, John Aman, the Amazing-Man, created in 1939. Thomas later wrote that he and artist/co-creator Gil Kane had

The film mentioned by Thomas is King Boxer, aka Five Fingers of Death (1972), which presents the Iron Fist technique. Thomas further discussed the character's creation stating, "When Stan Lee gave me a verbal approval to star him in a series, I contacted Gil Kane and we worked out the costume and story.  I had Gil give him a dragon brand on his chest, inspired by the one branded into Bullseye, a great western character created by Joe Simon and Jack Kirby.  At Gil's urging, we took some story elements from Bill Everett's 1939 hero Amazing-Man, which itself had borrowed heavily from James Hilton's novel Lost Horizon and the first movie made from it, which introduced "Shangri-La" to the world."

Publication history
Debuting in a story written by Thomas and pencilled by Kane in the umbrella title Marvel Premiere #15–25 (May 1974 – October 1975), he was then written successively by Len Wein, Doug Moench, Tony Isabella, and Chris Claremont, with art by successive pencillers Larry Hama, Arvell Jones, Pat Broderick, and, in some of his earliest professional work, John Byrne. As the Marvel Premiere issues had successfully established a considerable readership for the character, following this run, Iron Fist was immediately spun off into the solo series Iron Fist, which ran 15 issues (November 1975 – September 1977). The solo series was written by Claremont and pencilled by Byrne. A subplot involving the Steel Serpent left unresolved by the cancellation of the series was wrapped up in issues #63–64 of Marvel Team-Up, the latter of which featured Rand kiss Misty Knight, marking the first interracial kiss and first long-term interracial couple in Marvel Comics history, as well as the first couple with an age difference in which the woman was older than her man.

To rescue the character from cancellation, Marvel paired Iron Fist with another character who was no longer popular enough to sustain his own series, Luke Cage. The two characters were partnered in a three-part story in Cage's series Power Man #48–50. The title of the series changed to Power Man and Iron Fist with issue #50 (April 1978), although the indicia did not reflect this change until issue #67. Iron Fist co-starred in the series until the final issue (#125, September 1986). Writer Jim Owsley (subsequently known as Christopher Priest) later commented, "Fist's death was senseless and shocking and completely unforeseen. It took the readers' heads clean off. And, to this day, people are mad about it. Forgetting, it seems, that (a) you were supposed to be mad, that death is senseless and Fist's death was supposed to be senseless, or that (b) this is a comic book."

Iron Fist was revived half a decade later in Namor, the Sub-Mariner #21–25 (December 1991 – April 1992), a story which revealed that the character killed in Power Man and Iron Fist #125 was a doppelgänger. The story was both written and drawn by Byrne, who found the manner of Iron Fist's death objectionable and later commented, "In one of those amazing examples of Marvel serendipity, it turned out to be fairly easy not only to resurrect Danny, but to make it seem like that was the plan all along." Iron Fist then became a frequently starring character in the anthology series Marvel Comics Presents, featuring in three multi-part story arcs and four one-shot stories in 1992 and 1993. Two solo miniseries followed: Iron Fist (vol. 2) #1–2 (September–October 1996), by writer James Felder and penciller Robert Brown; and Iron Fist (vol. 3) #1–3 (July–September 1998), by writer Dan Jurgens and penciller Jackson Guice. Also around this time, he was among the ensemble of the group series Heroes for Hire which ran 19 issues (July 1997 – January 1999).

Following a four-issue miniseries by writer Jay Faerber and penciller Jamal Igle, Iron Fist: Wolverine (November 2000 – February 2001), co-starring the X-Men character Wolverine and cover-billed as Iron Fist/Wolverine: The Return of K'un-Lun, came another solo miniseries, Iron Fist vol. 4 #1–6 (May–October 2004), by writer Jim Mullaney and penciller Kevin Lau. Subsequently, a new Iron Fist series premiered called The Immortal Iron Fist. The series was written jointly by Ed Brubaker and Matt Fraction from issues #1–14 (January 2007 – June 2008) with artists Travel Foreman and David Aja. Fraction wrote issues #15 and 16 alone. From issue #17 (September 2008) to the series' cancellation at issue #27 (August 2009), the series was written by Duane Swierczynski and largely drawn by a returning Travel Foreman.

Iron Fist's appearances outside his own title include three Iron Fist stories in Marvel's black-and-white comics magazine The Deadly Hands of Kung Fu #10 (March 1975), an additional story co-starring the Sons of the Tiger in issue #18 (November 1975), and a six-part serial, "The Living Weapon", in #19–24 (December 1975 – May 1976). He made guest appearances in such titles as Marvel Two-in-One, Marvel Team-Up, the Submariner series Namor, Black Panther, and Daredevil. Iron Fist appeared as a regular character throughout the 2010–2013 New Avengers series, from issue #1 (August 2010) through its final issue, #34 (January 2013). In 2014, Iron Fist was given new life and set to star in a new 12-issue comic book series written and drawn by Kaare Andrews titled Iron Fist: The Living Weapon as part of the All-New Marvel NOW! event.

In January 2021, Iron Fist starred in the series Iron Fist: Heart of the Dragon, written by Larry Hama with art by David Wachter. In October 2021, Marvel announced that Danny Rand will retire as Iron Fist and pass the mantle to a successor. The five-issue limited series, written by Alyssa Wong and art by Michael YG, was released in February 2022, which revealed Lin Lie as the new Iron Fist and Rand appearing in a supporting role.

Fictional character biography

Background
Danny Rand was born in New York City. His father, Wendell Rand, as a young boy happened upon the mystical city of K'un-L'un. During his time in K'un-L'un, Wendell saved the life of the city's ruler, Lord Tuan, and was adopted as Tuan's son. However, Wendell eventually left K'un-L'un and became a wealthy entrepreneur in the United States. He married socialite Heather Duncan and had a child, Daniel. Wendell later organizes an expedition to again seek out K'un-L'un, taking his wife Heather, his business partner Harold Meachum and nine-year-old Danny. During the journey up the mountain, Danny slips off the path, his tie-rope taking his mother and father with him. Meachum, who also loves Heather, forces Wendell to plunge to his death but offers to rescue Heather and Danny. She rejects his help. Heather and Danny come across a makeshift bridge that appears out of nowhere and are attacked by a pack of wolves. Heather throws herself on the wolves to save Danny and is killed even as archers from K'un-L'un attempt to save her. The archers take the grieving Danny to see Yu-Ti, the hooded ruler of K'un-L'un. When Danny expresses his desire for vengeance, Yü-Ti apprentices him to Lei Kung the Thunderer, who teaches him martial arts. Danny proves to be the most gifted of Lei Kung's students. He toughens his fists by plunging them into buckets of sand, gravel, and rock. At 19, Danny is given the chance to attain the power of the Iron Fist by fighting and defeating the dragon Shou-Lao the Undying, who guards the molten heart that had been torn from its body. Guessing that the heart provides life energy to Shou-Lao through the dragon-shaped scar on its chest, Danny covers the scar with his own body and hangs on until Shou-Lao collapses and dies, in the process burning a dragon brand into his own chest. Having killed Shou-Lao, he enters its cave and plunges his fists into a brazier containing the creature's molten heart, emerging with the power of the Iron Fist. It is later revealed that Danny is part of a long lineage of Iron Fists. When K'un-L'un reappears on Earth after 10 years, Danny leaves to find his father's killer. Returning to New York, Danny Rand, dressed in the ceremonial garb of the Iron Fist, seeks out Harold Meachum, now head of Meachum Industries. After overcoming a number of attempts on his life, he confronts Meachum in his office, only to find the man legless—an amputation carried out when, after abandoning Danny and his mother, he was caught in heavy snow and his legs became frostbitten. Meachum accepts his fate and tells Iron Fist to kill him. Overcome with pity, Iron Fist walks away. At that moment Meachum is murdered by a mysterious ninja, and his daughter Joy blames Iron Fist for the death.

Eventually, Iron Fist clears his name and begins a career as a superhero, aided by his friends Colleen Wing and Misty Knight. Notable adversaries in his early career include Sabretooth, the mysterious Master Khan (whom the ninja that killed Meachum once served), and the Steel Serpent, the exiled son of Lei Kung who coveted the Iron Fist power.

Heroes for Hire
While working undercover, Misty Knight infiltrates the organization of crime lord John Bushmaster. When Bushmaster discovers Knight's treachery, he kidnaps Claire Temple and Noah Burstein, close associates of Luke Cage, better known as Power Man, and holds them hostage to force Cage to eliminate Knight. Iron Fist is on hand to stop him, however, and after a battle, the truth comes out. Rand helps Cage and the Daughters of the Dragon (Knight and Wing) battle Bushmaster, rescue Temple and Burstein, and obtain evidence that proves Cage's innocence of prior drug charges. Afterwards, Iron Fist and Power Man become partners, forming Heroes for Hire, Inc. Iron Fist, in his secret identity of Danny Rand, resumes control of his parents' fortune as half of Rand-Meachum, Inc., making him quite wealthy. This causes tension between Rand and Cage, who was raised poor. Power Man and Iron Fist's partnership ends when Rand is diagnosed with cancer and gets kidnapped as part of a plot masterminded by Master Khan. Just prior to a battle with the Black Dragon Chiantang (the brother of the mythical Dragon King), Danny is replaced by a doppelgänger created by the extra-dimensional H'ylthri. The double (who wears a red variant of the Iron Fist costume) is killed by Captain Hero a short time later. Cage, now the prime suspect in Rand's apparent death, becomes a fugitive.

Resurrection
While in stasis in K'un-L'un with the H'ylthri, Iron Fist manages to focus his chi, curing the cancer. He is later freed from stasis by Namor. Rand and Cage reform Heroes for Hire, Inc. with an expanded team, this time working for Namor's Oracle Corporation. Namor ultimately dissolves Oracle as well as Heroes for Hire, Inc. Iron Fist later loses his powers to Junzo Muto, the young leader of the Hand, and subsequently becomes the guardian of a pack of displaced dragons in Tokyo. His powers are eventually restored by Chiantang, who brainwashes Iron Fist and forces him to battle Black Panther. Black Panther is able to free Iron Fist from the creature's control, and the two work together to defeat the Black Dragon in Wakanda. In the Iron Fist miniseries, Miranda Rand-K'ai also returns from the dead. The H'ylthri revive her and promise to restore her to full life if she retrieves the extra-dimensional artifact known as the Zodiac Key. To this end, she takes the identity of Death Sting, bringing her into conflict with Iron Fist as well as with S.H.I.E.L.D. When the H'ylthri try to kill Iron Fist, Miranda turns the power of the Zodiac Key against them, seemingly killing herself in the process. However, exposure to chemicals from the H'ylthri pods prevented her death.

Posing as Daredevil
Rand disguises himself as Daredevil to convince the media and the public that Matt Murdock is not the masked vigilante. During the "Civil War" storyline, he opposes the Superhuman Registration Act, joining Captain America while still pretending to be Daredevil. Rand is apprehended by Pro-Registration forces. He is later freed from the Negative Zone Prison, joining Captain America's team to battle Iron Man's forces.

New Avengers
After the arrest of Captain America, Rand joins the New Avengers, an underground group provided with secure accommodation by Doctor Strange and which includes his former teammate Luke Cage. In the public eye, Rand is able to avoid arrest with legal loopholes. Rand leaves the New Avengers, due to a variety of problems, but lets them know, if they ever need him, to give him a call.  He later aids the New Avengers in locating and rescuing Cage from Norman Osborn after Cage suffered a heart attack and was summarily taken into custody as a fugitive.

The Immortal Iron Fist

Orson Randall, Danny Rand's immediate predecessor, seeks out Danny Rand in New York and gives him The Book of the Iron Fist, a sacred ledger supposedly containing all the kung fu secrets of previous Iron Fists, which Randall claims will be necessary if Rand is to compete successfully in the coming tournament of the Seven Champions. The Steel Serpent, whose powers have been greatly augmented by the Crane Mother, dispatches Randall. On the brink of death, Randall surrenders his chi to Rand, giving him sufficient power to battle the Serpent to a standstill. After the battle, Rand is summoned by his master, Lei Kung (who is also the father of Steel Serpent) to compete in a tournament that will decide the cycle according to which each of the Seven Cities of Heaven appears on Earth. However, the leaders of the Seven Cities had secretly erected gateways between Earth and each city without the knowledge of the populace. The corruption of the leaders of the Seven Cities of Heaven spurs Iron Fist, Lei Kung, Orson Randall's daughter, and John Aman to plan a revolution. Iron Fist discovers that Crane Mother and Xao, a high-ranking HYDRA operative, are planning to destroy K'un-Lun by using a portal. Upon learning of the plot, Steel Serpent helps Rand and the other Immortal Weapons defeat Xao.

Rand destroys the train intended to destroy K'un-L'un by extending his chi to find the train's electromagnetic field. Meanwhile, the revolution orchestrated by Lei Kung and Orson's daughter proves successful, with Nu-an, the Yu-Ti of K'un-Lun fleeing in terror. When Rand confronts Xao, Xao reveals that there is an eighth city of Heaven before killing himself. Rand suggests Lei Kung as the new Yu-Ti, with Orson's unnamed daughter as the new Thunderer.

After learning that the Randall fortune that started Rand International was formed from the oppression of the Cities of Heaven, Rand decides to transform the company into a non-profit organization, dedicated to helping the poor. He also sets up the Thunder Dojo in Harlem to help inner-city children, buys back the old Heroes for Hire building as the new Rand International Headquarters and his new home, while offering Luke Cage a position at the company. He also tries to reconnect with Misty Knight. Rand, on his 33rd birthday, learns every single one of the previous Iron Fists died at the age of 33, except Orson Randall, who vanished at that time. Soon afterward, Rand is attacked and defeated by Zhou Cheng, a servant of Ch'l-Lin, who claims to have killed the Iron Fists in order to enter K'un-Lun and devour the egg that births the next incarnation of Shou-Lao the Undying every generation, thus wiping out K'un-Lun's Iron Fist legacy. Luke, Misty, and Colleen arrive and save Rand. Rand has his shoulder dislocated during a second battle with Cheng, but manages to defeat Cheng even in his weakened state. Following the duel, the Immortal Weapons, Luke, Colleen, and Misty arrive, and reveal to Rand that they have discovered a map in Cheng's apartment that leads to the Eighth City of Heaven. Rand and the others realize that this is where Ch'l-Lin originated, and depart for the Eighth City.

In the Eighth City, he meets Quan Yaozu, the first Iron Fist, who became disillusioned with K'un-Lun and rose up to rule the Eighth City as Changming. Rand and Fat Cobra manage to defeat Quan. Rand's actions during their battles impress Quan, who decides that Rand may be living proof that K'un-Lun is not the corrupt city it once was. Rand and Davos agree to guide Quan to K'un-Lun and arrange a meeting between him and Lei-Kung to give Quan a forum for his grievances. However, when Rand returns to New York, he finds a HYDRA cell waiting for him at Rand International, seeking retribution for the death of Xao, and holding Misty hostage. In the ensuing battle, Rand International is destroyed, but Rand and Misty escape unharmed. Now left with only a fraction of his former net worth, Rand and Misty purchase a new condo in Harlem, and Rand decides to focus all of his attention and remaining resources at the Thunder Dojo. While moving into their new home, Rand asks Misty to marry him. Initially skeptical of the offer, Misty accepts and reveals that she is pregnant with Rand's child.

Avengers reform
In the aftermath of Siege, Rand joins the newly reformed New Avengers. After finding out that Misty's pregnancy was false, Misty and Danny decide to move out of their apartment and live separately, but continue their relationship. During the "Shadowland" storyline, Danny later has an encounter with someone who is going by the name of Power Man. He and Luke Cage discover that the Power Man is Victor Alvarez, a survivor of a building that Bullseye blew up. Iron Fist becomes the new Power Man's mentor and the two become a team. During the "Fear Itself" storyline, Iron Fist and the Immortal Weapons are summoned to Beijing to close the gates of the Eighth City that are on the verge of opening. However, Danny is placed under mind control which creates a mystical interference with the ability of the Immortal Weapons to close the gate. He is then forced to battle his allies. Thanks to War Machine knocking him out, the mission is completed successfully. However, Doctor Strange realizes that Iron Fist is now an Immortal Weapon of Agamotto. During the "Avengers vs. X-Men" storyline, Iron Fist and Lei Kung bring Hope Summers to K'un-Lun to train as an Iron Fist, in order to defeat the Phoenix-possessed X-Men.

Marvel NOW!
In Iron Fist: The Living Weapon, Iron Fist is approached by a young monk named Pei, who tells him to return to K'un-Lun. Upon returning, Iron Fist discovers the city in ruins and Lei Kung dead at the hands of the One, a chi-powered robot who believed itself to be Danny's father Wendell Rand. Iron Fist is defeated by the One, but is rescued by his childhood friend Sparrow and the One's creator Fooh, who nurse him back to health and warn him that the One and Davos were working together to turn New York into New K'un-Lun. During Iron Fist's and the One's second confrontation, the One opens an artificial portal between Earth and the Heavens in an attempt to retrieve Wendell's deceased wife Heather Rand from the afterlife, the but Xian fire god Zhu Rong emerges in Manhattan to punish the mortals for upsetting the universal order. By focusing his chi energy into his fist and launching himself into Zhu Rong, Iron Fist defeats the fire god. Meanwhile, Davos attempts to take the power of the Iron Fist from a reborn Shou-Lou, but is stopped by Pei, who gains the power of the Iron Fist to defeat Davos and revive Shou-Lou, naming his adolescent reborn form "Gork". As the youngest person to ever bear the mark of the Iron Fist, Pei is subsequently taken in by Danny as his ward. In the Marvel NOW! era, Iron Fist rejoins Luke Cage as the Heroes For Hire, having been employed by Boomerang to arrest his former colleagues in the Sinister Six.

All-New, All-Different Marvel
In the All-New, All-Different Marvel era, Danny and Luke are forced to return to crime fighting after former Heroes for Hire secretary Jennifer "White Jennie" Royce becomes embroiled in a gang war with Black Mariah against Tombstone. After that is dealt with, Power Man and Iron Fist once again take to the streets as the Heroes for Hire. During the "Secret Empire" storyline, Iron Fist became a member of the Defenders alongside Daredevil, Luke Cage, and Jessica Jones. They, alongside Cloak and Dagger, Doctor Strange, and Spider-Woman, fought the Army of Evil during Hydra's takeover of the United States where they were defeated by Nitro. Iron Fist and those with him were trapped in the Darkforce dome by Blackout when his powers were enhanced by Baron Helmut Zemo using the Darkhold. During the "Hunt for Wolverine" storyline, Iron Fist babysat Danielle Cage while Luke and Jessica were away helping Iron Man and Spider-Man look for Wolverine's body after it went missing from its private resting place. After the mission was over, Luke and Jessica thanked Iron Fist for babysitting Danielle.

Heart of the Dragon
The dragons of the Heavenly Cities are being targeted by armies of undead ninjas and several villains, including Taskmaster, Lady Bullseye and Midnight Sun for their hearts, resulting in the deaths of many dragons and Tiger's Beautiful Daughter, prompting Iron Fist to team up with Luke, Pei, Gork, Fooh and the remaining Immortal Weapons to save the other dragons.  At the urging of the Xian goddess of Mercy Quan Yin, Iron Fist and the others use Fooh's portal technology to manifest the Heavenly Cities on Earth so that other heroes, including Okoye and Sunspot, can join in the defense against the hordes of zombies and villains. When the zombies prove too much for them, Iron Fist and the group retreat to the Heart of Heaven, where they come across Okoye slaying the dragon of the Heart of Heaven, who takes advantage of their shock to slay the newly rescued dragon of the Kingdom of Spiders as well; Okoye explains that she was told to kill them by Quan Yin and the Heart of Heaven's dragon in order to secure the cosmic balance, thus gaining the power of both dragons. Yama Dragonsbane, Danny's former lover Brenda Swanson, subsequently appears in the Heart of Heaven and reveals herself to be behind the dragon slayings in order to use their hearts to empower her master, the Hierophant, who is also summoned to the Heart of Heaven. While Fooh distracts the Hierophant, Iron Fist and the others travel to the Eighth City to destroy the Hierophant's undead army but are attacked by the city's Ghost Dragon. When the Ghost Dragon proves impossible to harm, Pei and Gork reluctantly allow Okoye to kill Gork for his heart, knowing that he and the other dragons can be revived if she can defeat the Hierophant. With Pei's and Gork's powers, Okoye is able to slay the Ghost Dragon and claim his power. When the Hierophant arrives, Danny transfers the Iron Fist to Okoye, granting her the full power of the Heavenly Cities. Okoye uses her combined dragon chi to defeat the Hierophant and Dragonsbane while Iron Fist and the others finish off the remaining undead. The Hierophant's death releases the hearts of the dragons slain by him and Okoye back to their respective Cities, although the Iron Fist powers of Danny, Pei and Gork remain with Okoye. Okoye attempts to return the Iron Fist back to Danny, who refuses, declaring that Okoye is the new Iron Fist. Due to her obligations to Wakanda, Okoye refuses and instead transfers the Iron Fist to Gork's newly reborn egg, leaving the title and power vacant.  Despite being powerless, an undeterred Danny declares to Luke that he will "live [life] to the fullest".

Devil's Reign
During the "Devil's Reign" storyline, Mayor Wilson Fisk outlaws superhero vigilantism in New York City.  Despite his retirement as Iron Fist, Danny is apprehended at his office by NYPD officers led by Thunderbolts member Crossbones.  Danny attempts to fight them off but is overpowered and incarcerated in the Myrmidon along with others targeted by the new law.  Danny, Moon Knight and Tony Stark are able to escape with the help of Sue Storm and Reed Richards.  After Fisk is defeated and Luke is elected mayor of New York City, Danny accompanies Luke on several of his first outings as mayor.

Meeting the New Iron Fist
While a powerless Danny fights several demons attacking a Chinese antique shop in Flushing for a mysterious green shard, he is helped by Lin Lie - formerly the superhero Sword Master - who is now garbed in the mantle of the Iron Fist and possesses the chi of Shou-Lao.  After they defeat the demons and recover the shard, Danny attempts to question Lie about his background and offers to help him, but Lie rebuffs him and flees through a portal in a nearby subway back to K'un-Lun.  Danny contacts Fat Cobra and the Bride of Nine Spiders with tracking down the new Iron Fist, eventually finding him in Gansu.  Danny travels with the two and Luke to China but he and Luke get separated from the two Immortal Weapons, who encounter Lie before him.  When an army the same demons from Flushing appear, Danny, Luke and the Immortal Weapons join forces with Lie and his friends to fight them.  When the Yu-Ti of K'un-Lun, Sparrow, and her best warriors are summoned by Danny for backup, the demons' leader and Lie's brother, Lin Feng, reveals that moment to be his true goal and steals Sparrow's portal to K'un-Lun to find the final tomb of his master Chiyou, leaving the K'un-Lun citizens trapped on Earth.  Danny offers housing to the displaced citizens and formally introduces himself to Lie.  Danny compliments Lie's acquired skills and offers to complete his training; Lie readily accepts.

Powers and abilities
Plunging his fists into the molten heart of the dragon Shou-Lao the Undying infused the dragon's superhuman energy into Rand. This, along with being trained by Lei Kung the Thunderer, gave Rand the power of the Iron Fist, allowing him to summon and focus his chi energy (also called natural energy or life force energy) to enhance his natural abilities to extraordinary levels. His strength, speed, stamina, durability, agility, reflexes and senses can all be greatly intensified, almost comparable to superhuman levels.

He is able to concentrate his own chi and the superhuman energy from Shou-Lao's heart into his hand, with it manifesting as a supernatural glow around his hand and fist. So concentrated, this "iron fist" can strike with superhuman hardness and impact, while his hand becomes impervious to pain and injury. Some of Rand's feats with the "iron fist" is knocking out Luke Cage, knocking out a drunken Hercules, taking down Black Panther (wearing his vibranium suit), and taking down the S.H.I.E L.D Helicarrier with a single punch. However, summoning the power required by this feat leaves Rand physically and mentally drained, unable to repeat the act for a time, as long as an entire day in certain instances, though after years of using the ability, it has become less draining. He can focus his chi inward to heal himself or outward to heal others of injury, as well as to give himself psychic senses and to telepathically fuse his consciousness with another person when looking directly into the pupil of his eye.

Rand is also a skilled acrobat, gymnast, and a master of all of K'un-Lun's martial arts, as well as various fighting styles from Earth, including Shaolin Kung Fu, Aikido, Fujian White Crane, Judo, Karate, Muay Thai, Ninjutsu, Wushu, and Wing Chun.

Other characters named Iron Fist
This section lists the other people who have been called Iron Fist:

Fan Fei
In 1,000,000 BC, a K'un-Lun native named Fan Fei was born to the Green Lotus House and had taken a fascination with the cavemen that lived outside K'un-Lun; going so far as to train a few of them in secret. After she was exposed, Fan Fei was chained up and forced to watch as her students were fed to Shou-Lou by Lei Kung. When she broke out, in the hopes that she will die fighting Shou-Lou, Fan Fei punched the dragon in his chest tattoo and gained his powers. Lei Kung had Fan Fei exiled from K'un-Lun, believing Shou-Lou was dead, and she traveled the world; fighting Deviants and the Gorgilla Clan of Man-Apes along the way. Fan Fei was approached by Mephisto, who wanted her to use her powers to conquer Earth, but she declined. In response, Mephisto granted his gifts to the Gorgilla Clan. After a fight with Fan Fei, Mephisto led the Gorgilla Clan's Ape King to the Power Infinity Gem, which he used to fight Fan Fei again. After recuperating, Fan Fei found herself at the entrance of K'un-Lun. Lei Kung states that her sentencing was wrong, as they learned Shou-Lou was immortal, and wanted to bring her home. However, she declined, stating that Earth was her home and her fights here are just the beginning. Fan Fei later banded together with Agamotto, Lady Phoenix, Odin, and Stone Age versions of Black Panther, Ghost Rider, and Star Brand to fought off a Celestial named the Fallen. They would go on to defeat it and seal it underground in what would later become South Africa.

Quan Yaozu
One of the first Iron Fists, Quan Yaozu was sent to the Eighth City to imprison the demonic creatures sent from there that had been plaguing K'un-Lun and the other Heavenly Cities, voluntarily staying behind to prevent them from escaping. When the Yu-Ti of K'un-Lun began using the Eight City to imprison citizens who threatened his rule, including innocents, Quan became disillusioned with K'un-Lun and eventually took control of the Eighth City, ruling it as "Changming". Centuries later, when Danny and the Immortal weapons arrive in the Eighth City at the behest of Lei Kung to free the wrongfully convicted prisoners, Quan has them captured and forces them to fight to the death in numerous matches.  When Danny finds out about Quan's history, he is able to prove his altruistic intentions, which convinces Quan that K'un-Lun is no longer the corrupt city as it once was and agrees to meet Lei Kung.

Li Park
In 730 A.D., a pacifist named Li Park became the new Iron Fist, who sought to resolve conflict by avoiding direct conflict. As a local village battled with a Chinese general intent on conquering K'un-Lun, which had been struck by a plague, Li utilized his newly discovered hypnotic fist technique to dissuade the soldiers. When his technique failed to save the villagers, Li put aside his pacifism and used more aggressive actions. Ultimately, Li was able to rescue the remaining villagers and led them to K’un-Lun, where they helped repopulate the city.

Gale
During the 11th Century, the outlaw Atlantean princess Gale wielded the powers of the Iron Fist. She was part of Thor's incarnation of the Avengers.

Bei-Ming Tian
Bei Ming-Tian was the Iron Fist circa 1227 AD. He protected his village from the invading Mongol Army and even slew Genghis Khan himself in battle.

Fongji Wu
Centuries ago, the Yu-Ti Nu-An had a recurring dream associating a red-haired girl with the Phoenix and a dragon. He later finds a matching red-haired girl named Fongji Wu in the streets of K'un-L'un and has her trained as the Iron Fist. Nu-An asks for Leonardo da Vinci to come to K'un-L'un in order to help protect the world against the Phoenix's arrival; meanwhile, Fongji is submitted to a hard training, eventually manifesting the Phoenix powers. Nu-An orders her to battle the dragon Shao-Lao as established by the ritual of the Iron Fist. Fongji is successful in her test and becomes the Iron Fist, shortly before Da Vinci sees the Phoenix coming towards Earth. Fongji is able to bond with the Phoenix and remain in control of herself, but she feels that Earth is still not ready for its evolution and departs.

Wu Ao-Shi
In 1545 A.D., a young protégé of Lei Kung named Wu Ao-Shi defeated Shou-Lou the Undying and claimed the power of the Iron Fist for herself. During her training, she fell in love and became betrothed to a fisherman, who became distraught at the violence destined for the Iron Fist and left her and K'un-Lun once the city merged with Earth; Wu followed shortly after to search for her love. During her travels Wu made a living as a mercenary and took on a job to liberate Pinghai Bay from the Wokou pirates, but was defeated and imprisoned. Wu was rescued by her beloved, and killed the pirates by infusing her chi into an arrow, turning it into an explosive projective. Wu and the fisherman spent their remaining years together in the liberated territory, with Wu later becoming known as the Pirate Queen of Pinghai Bay. Centuries later, Wu Ai-Shi's exploits were made into a movie called Pinghai Bay.

Bei Bang-Wen
Sometime in the mid-19th century, an Iron Fist known as Bei Bang-Wen developed an Iron Fist technique known as the Perfect Strategy Mind, which let him use the chi of Shou-Lou in more intellectual ways but also left him overconfident. In 1860, Bei assisted the Chinese against the British and French forces during the Second Opium War. Despite forming a scenario taking down tens of thousands of enemy soldiers at the Taku Forts, Bei and his Chinese allies were defeated at the Taku Forts and Bei was taken prisoner. After befriending fellow captive and mythical warrior Vivatma Visvajit, the two escaped from prison and journeyed to Vivatma's homeland of Burma, where they were ambushed by the energy-draining assassin Tiger Jani. Bei and Vivatma defeated Jani with their reawakened their Iron Fist and Brahman powers, respectively. A physically and mentally worn Bei returned home to K'un-Lun, relinquishing his powers so that the cycle of the Iron Fist could begin again and took a wife who bore him thirteen sons.

Kwai Jun-Fan
Bei Bang-Wen's successor to the Iron Fist, Kwai Jun-Fan ventured the Wild West of Texas circa 1878 AD, where he was killed by Zhou Cheng under the influence of Ch'i-Lin.

Orson Randall
Born and raised in K'un-Lun after his parents' airship crashed in the city in the late 19th century, Orson Randall became the Iron Fist after besting Shou-Lao when he was seventeen years old, becoming the first Westerner to do so. During World War I, Randall joined the Freedom's Five along with Union Jack, Phantom Eagle, Crimson Cavalier and Sir Steel. The bloodshed Randall witnessed in the war deeply traumatized him, causing him to turn to drugs to escape. In 1933, Randall was summoned back to K'un-Lun to participate in the Tournament of Heaven, but refused to participate, having been changed by his experiences in the war. When confronted by the Immortal Weapons, Randall killed the Crane Champion of K'un-Zi in self defense and fled, taking the Book of the Iron Fist with him.

While in hiding, Randall met young orphan Wendell Rand and adopted him as his ward, training him in martial arts while filling his head with stories of K'un-Lun and the Iron Fist, causing Wendell to seek the city out himself once he came of age. Sometime after the 1960s Randall was believed to have died, leaving behind a vast fortune to Wendell, making him incredibly wealthy. In truth, Randall was living in drug-soaked seclusion in Thailand for decades. While the next Tournament of Heaven neared, the Steel Serpent and his allies arrived to kill him, causing Randall to flee to New York to seek out his successor and Wendell's son Danny, giving him the Book of the Iron Fist and informing him of the upcoming Tournament and their histories. During another encounter with the Steel Serpent, Randall is mortally wounded and transfers his chi to Danny before dying.

Pei
A young monk of K'un-Lun, Pei fled from the city when Davos and the One staged a coup, taking the unhatched egg of the latest incarnation of Shou-Lao with her. Pei was able to find Danny in New York and told him to go back to save K'un-Lun. While under her care, the egg prematurely hatches into an adolescent dragon, whom Pei names "Gork". When Davos catches up to them and kills Gork, Pei inadvertently ends up with the power of the Iron Fist, becoming one of the youngest to do so, and uses its power to defeat Davos and revive Gork and all previous incarnations of Shou-Lou. Danny subsequently takes her under his wing as his ward and the two being training together to master their Iron Fist powers. During the Hierophant's attacks on the dragons of the Heavenly Cities, Pei reluctantly allows Okoye to sacrifice Gork and transfers her Iron Fist power to augment Okoye's acquired dragon chi to defeat the Hierophant and save the dragons.

Wah Sing-Rand
In an alternate timeline set in the 31st century, Wah Sing-Rand, a K'un-Lun native and Danny's possible descendant, defeats Shou-Lou, becoming one of the youngest Iron Fists in history. While traveling to the planet Yaochi to free it from the tyrannical President Xing, his shuttle is frozen in a temporal pocket, leaving him trapped for 24 years. In circa 3099 AD., he was able to defeat Xing and liberate Yaochi but at the cost of his own life.

Supporting characters

Other versions

MC2
Iron Fist appeared in the pages of Spider-Girl #24, in which he is retired after the death of Misty Knight (his wife in this universe). However, he temporarily steps back into costume to aid Spider-Girl against the might of Dragon Fist.

Marvel Zombies
Iron Fist is shown twice in battle during the Marvel Zombies miniseries. He can be seen in several splash panels, as well as being bitten by a zombie version of Luke Cage, punching a hole through a zombified Black Cat and once again being bitten, apparently avoiding infection through his healing abilities. A different Iron Fist appears in Marvel Zombies Return in an alternate universe where he is unaffected by the zombie outbreak until Wolverine from the Marvel Zombies universe kills him with his claws.

Ultimate Marvel
Daniel Rand has appeared in Ultimate Spider-Man. His first appearance in the Ultimate universe was in Ultimate Spider-Man #1/2. Later, he appeared in the Warriors story arc (issues #79–85) along with Shang-Chi, Moon Knight, and others. He reappears in the Ultimate Knights arc, as a member of a Daredevil-led team trying to take down the Kingpin. In Ultimate Spider-Man #107, however, he has apparently betrayed the group to the Kingpin. Daredevil has uncovered the deception and ends issue #109 demanding answers from Rand. In issue #110 Iron Fist reveals that he has a daughter and the Kingpin threatened her life, so he chose his daughter's life over Daredevil's, and the rest of the heroes that teamed up to take down the Kingpin. He did distract Kingpin while Daredevil grabbed Kingpin's wife. Rand is last seen with his daughter and his daughter's mother Colleen Wing.

House of M
In the House of M reality, Daniel Rand emerges from K'un-Lun, unaware of the mutant-dominated planet. He is attacked by mutant police, and eventually joins Luke Cage's Human Resistance Movement.

Earth-13584
In A.I.M.'s pocket dimension of Earth-13584, Iron Fist appears as a member of Spider-Man's gang.

Deadpool 2099
Iron Fist is one of the few heroes still alive in 2099, he is known as the "Defender of the Streets" and now leads a large group of martial artists to continue his vigilante activities. Deadpool requests his aid to help deal with Wade's daughter, Warda, and Rand agrees to help his oldest living friend.

Secret Wars (2015)
During the Secret Wars storyline, Iron Fist is Rand-K'ai, member of the Iron Fist school and the sheriff and protector of the wuxia-inspired K'un-L'un region of Battleworld. In this reality, he unwillingly serves the long-reigning Emperor Zheng Zu, the master of the ruthless Ten Rings school, the enemies of the more benevolent Iron Fist school. Rand-K'ai hunts after Shang-Chi, the exiled son of Zu, for the murder of his master Lord Tuan although he suspects the emperor to be involved. Representing the Iron Fist, Rand-K'ai enters the tournament to decide the new ruler of K'un-L'un and eventually confronts Shang-Chi along with Red Sai, master of the Red Hand and the emperor's assassin, in the penultimate round of the Thirteen Chambers. During the fight, Shang-Chi is poisoned by Red Sai, who confesses that Zu had sent her to assassinate Tuan but ultimately failed. To spare his lover and her students from the emperor's wrath, Shang-Chi killed Tuan; Zu implicated and exiled his son for the murder to cover his own involvement. After the truth is revealed, Rand-K'ai uses his Chi to burn the poison in Shang-Chi's body and lets him pass so that he could defeat his father. After Shang-Chi emerges victorious, Rand-K'ai pledges himself to the new emperor.

Reception
Iron Fist is ranked as the 195th-greatest comic book character of all time by Wizard magazine. IGN also ranked Iron Fist as the 68th-greatest comic book hero of all time stating that in the Marvel Universe, mastery of martial arts is enough to qualify as a superpower, and none are more "super" at the art of fighting than Iron Fist, and as #46 on their list of the "Top 50 Avengers".

Controversy
The story of Iron Fist has been criticized for cultural appropriation, orientalism and reinforcing a white savior narrative, with Rob Bricken of io9 summarizing Danny Rand as a clichéd "white guy [who] discovers a foreign culture, learns its ways, and becomes better at it than the people born into it".  Upon the announcement of the television series, an online movement was started to change Iron Fist as an Asian-American character to subvert offensive tropes while providing some depth to the character. Supporters of the movement included comic writer Gail Simone, who acknowledged she was a fan of Iron Fist but agreed that the character should be changed to Asian-American. The role ultimately went to English actor Finn Jones, whose performance was panned by critics along with the show's depiction of Asian culture during its first season.

Roy Thomas, co-creator of Iron Fist, defended the character in response to criticism, arguing that Iron Fist was created for a less "PC" time.  While Thomas added that he would not be bothered if Iron Fist had been changed to Asian-American, he was not "ashamed" for making Rand white. Comic book creator Rob Liefeld also defended the character, denying that Rand's story was racist and argued that changing his race to Asian was "reverse whitewashing".  Other commentators have echoed similar sentiments; while acknowledging that Rand's origins were problematic, some felt that changing him to Asian would reinforce the stereotype of Asians being proficient in martial arts.

In an apparent response to the racial backlash against the character and the negative reception of the television series, Marvel announced in 2021 that Danny Rand will leave the mantle and a new younger Iron Fist of Asian descent will be introduced in a new comic series helmed by an Asian creative team. Alyssa Wong, writer of the new series, explained that it was "impossible to be unaware of the controversy", which she took into consideration when writing the series.  While noting that there had been Iron Fists of Asian descent before, Wong pointed out that all of them were supporting characters in Rand's story or long dead, arguing that the new Iron Fist was an important step forward for the title and the ongoing push for diversity.  Wong also acknowledged Rand's sizeable fanbase despite criticisms, reassuring that he would play an important role for the new Iron Fist and that the new series would not "erase" Rand's history and legacy but instead build upon it.  The new series, which revealed the Chinese superhero Sword Master as the new Iron Fist, has since received critical acclaim.

Collected editions
Bronze Age Collections

The Immortal Iron Fist

Power Man and Iron Fist

Iron Fist

Iron Fist: The Living Weapon

Miniseries

In other media

Television

Animation
 Iron Fist appears in The Super Hero Squad Show episode "A Brat Walks Among Us", voiced by Mikey Kelley. This version is a member of the Heroes for Hire.
 Iron Fist appears in The Avengers: Earth's Mightiest Heroes, voiced by Loren Lester. This version is a member of the Heroes for Hire and founding member of the New Avengers.
 Iron Fist appears in Ultimate Spider-Man, voiced by Greg Cipes. This version is a teenager, best friend of Luke Cage, and a member of a S.H.I.E.L.D. team led by Spider-Man who voices his opinions through proverbs. Despite coming from an affluent background, Iron Fist chooses to live a simple life among his friends as part of his training. Having completed most of his training in K'un-L'un, he joined S.H.I.E.L.D. to gain a more worldly experience. Later in the series, he becomes a founding member of the New Warriors.
 Iron Fist appears in Lego Marvel Super Heroes: Maximum Overload, voiced again by Greg Cipes.
 Iron Fist appears in the Avengers Assemble episode "The Immortal Weapon", voiced again by Greg Cipes.
 Iron Fist appears in Marvel Disk Wars: The Avengers, voiced by Go Shinommiya in the Japanese version and Liam O'Brien in the English version.
 Iron Fist appears in Marvel Future Avengers, voiced by Go Shinomiya in the Japanese version and by Johnny Yong Bosch in the English version.

Live-action

Danny Rand / Iron Fist appears in Marvel's Netflix television series, portrayed by Finn Jones as an adult and Toby Nichols as an adolescent.
 First appearing in a self-titled series, this version befriended Ward and Joy Meachum over their fathers both running Rand Enterprises as children before Danny was presumed dead in a plane crash orchestrated by his friends' father Harold Meachum. Having survived the crash, Danny is rescued by monks from K'un-L'un and taken there to train under them. In the present, he returns as an adult to regain control of Rand Enterprises, during which he allies himself with Colleen Wing and battles the Hand.
 Rand also appears in The Defenders, in which he helps found the eponymous group, and the Luke Cage episode "The Main Ingredient".

Film
In May 2000, Marvel Studios brought Artisan Entertainment to co-finance an Iron Fist film, hiring Ray Park to star and John Turman to write the script in January 2001. In preparation, Park extensively read the comics that Iron Fist had appeared in. Kirk Wong signed to direct in July 2001, with filming set for late 2001/early 2002. Iron Fist nearly went into pre-production in March 2002, but Wong left the project in April 2002. By August 2002, pre-production had started. Filming was pushed back to late 2002, and then to late 2003. In March 2003, Marvel announced a 2004 release date. In April 2003, Steve Carr entered negotiations to direct. In November 2003, the release date was moved to 2006. In March 2007, Carr placed Iron Fist on hold due to scheduling conflicts. In 2009, Marvel announced they had begun hiring a group of writers to help come up with creative ways to launch its lesser-known properties, such as Iron Fist. In August 2010, Marvel Studios hired Rich Wilkes to write the screenplay. Marvel has a future Iron Fist film project planned. In November 2013, Disney CEO Bob Iger stated that they "probably were never going to make feature films about" characters featured in Marvel's Netflix TV series, but that if the Netflix series became popular, "[it was] quite possible that they could become feature films".

Video games
 Iron Fist appears as an assist character in Spider-Man and Venom: Maximum Carnage.
 Iron Fist makes a cameo appearance in The Amazing Spider-Man: Lethal Foes.
 Iron Fist appears as a playable character in Spider-Man: Friend or Foe, voiced by John Rubinow. This version is a S.H.I.E.L.D. agent.
 Iron Fist appears as a playable character in Vicarious Visions version of Marvel: Ultimate Alliance 2, voiced by Peter Dobson. This version supports Captain America in opposing the Superhuman Registration Act.
 Iron Fist makes a cameo appearance in Ryu's ending in Marvel vs. Capcom 3: Fate of Two Worlds.
 Iron Fist appears as a playable character in Ultimate Marvel vs. Capcom 3, voiced by Loren Lester.
 Iron Fist appears as a playable character in Marvel Avengers Alliance.
 Iron Fist appears in LittleBigPlanet via the "Marvel Costume Kit 5" DLC.
 Iron Fist appears as an assist, later playable, character in Marvel Heroes, voiced initially by JP Karliak and again by Johnny Yong Bosch. This version is a member of the Heroes for Hire.
 Iron Fist appears as a playable character in Lego Marvel Super Heroes, voiced by Andrew Kishino.
 Iron Fist appears as a playable character in Disney Infinity 2.0, voiced again by Greg Cipes.
 Iron Fist appears as a playable character in Marvel Contest of Champions.
 Iron Fist appears as a playable character in Disney Infinity 3.0, voiced again by Greg Cipes.
 Iron Fist appears as a playable character in Lego Marvel's Avengers, voiced again by Greg Cipes.
 Iron Fist appears as a playable character in Marvel: Future Fight.
 Iron Fist appears as a playable character in Marvel Puzzle Quest.
 Iron Fist appears as a playable character in Lego Marvel Superheroes 2, voiced by Martin T. Sherman.
 Iron Fist appears as a playable character in Marvel Ultimate Alliance 3: The Black Order, voiced again by Johnny Yong Bosch.

Miscellaneous
 Iron Fist appears in the Wolverine: Weapon X motion comic, voiced by Brian Drummond.
 Iron Fist appears in the War of the Realms: Marvel Ultimate Comics motion comic, voiced by Aidan Drummond.

References

External links

 Iron Fist at Marvel.com
 
 
 
 Iron Fist at Don Markstein's Toonopedia. Archived from the original on September 17, 2016.

 
Avengers (comics) characters
Characters created by Gil Kane
Characters created by Roy Thomas
Comics characters introduced in 1974
Fictional bodyguards
Fictional characters from New York City
Fictional characters with healing abilities
Fictional dragonslayers
Fictional private investigators
Fictional secret agents and spies
Fictional vegan and vegetarian characters
Marvel Comics characters with superhuman strength
Marvel Comics male superheroes
Marvel Comics martial artists
Marvel Comics orphans
Vigilante characters in comics